Mário Jorge Amora Loja (born 27 December 1977) is a Portuguese former professional footballer who played as a left back or a central defender.

Club career
Born in Setúbal, Loja joined local club Vitória FC's youth system in 1989, aged 11. From 1996 to 2005, save for one season, he competed in the Primeira Liga, also representing Boavista F.C. and S.C. Beira-Mar and appearing in a total of 152 matches.

Loja moved abroad in the summer of 2005, signing with US Créteil-Lusitanos and spending his first two years in the French Ligue 2. Subsequently, he returned to his homeland, where he played lower league or amateur football until his retirement.

References

External links
 
 
 

1977 births
Living people
Sportspeople from Setúbal
Portuguese footballers
Association football defenders
Primeira Liga players
Liga Portugal 2 players
Segunda Divisão players
Vitória F.C. players
Boavista F.C. players
S.C. Beira-Mar players
F.C. Arouca players
G.D. Fabril players
Ligue 2 players
Championnat National players
US Créteil-Lusitanos players
Portugal youth international footballers
Portugal under-21 international footballers
Portuguese expatriate footballers
Expatriate footballers in France
Portuguese expatriate sportspeople in France